James Liu may refer to:

James T. C. Liu (1919–1993), historian of China
James J. Y. Liu (1926–1986), scholar of Chinese literature

See also
James Lau (born 1950), Hong Kong official